Sarpol-e Zahab County (Šaharestâne Sarpole Zahâb; Sarpell-i zahaw (Kurdish: سه‌رپێڵی زه‌هاو, Serpêllî Zehaw) is in Kermanshah province, Iran. The capital of the county is the city of Sarpol-e Zahab, whose people are adherents of Shia, Sunni and Yarsan. At the 2006 census, the county's population was 81,428 in 18,233 households. The following census in 2011 counted 85,616 people in 21,677 households. At the 2016 census, the county's population was 85,342 in 23,696 households, by which time Jeygaran Rural District and Sarqaleh Rural District had been separated from Salas-e Babajani County to join Sarpol-e Zahab County.

Administrative divisions

The population history and structural changes of Sarpol-e Zahab County's administrative divisions over three consecutive censuses are shown in the following table. The latest census shows two districts, eight rural districts, and one city.

Archaeological findings 
Archaeologists published in the journal Antiquity in August 2019 about the discovery of a defensive wall named “Gawri wall” or “Gawri Chen Wall” which was found near the present-day Iranian-Iraqi border and stretched about 115 kilometers. It is estimated that, the wall was built during the rule of the Parthians or Sasanians.

According to Sajjad Alibeigi, “With an estimated volume of approximately one million cubic meters of stone, it would have required significant resources in terms of workforce, materials and time, remnants of structures, now destroyed, are visible in places along the wall. These may have been associated turrets [small towers] or buildings”.

See also
Qasr-e Shirin County
Gilan-e Gharb County
Dalahu County

References

 

Counties of Kermanshah Province